Ease or EASE may refer to:

Computing
 Ease (programming language)
 Enhanced Acoustic Simulator for Engineers, software for optimizing acoustics

Health and medicine
 Methylone, marketed briefly in New Zealand as Ease
Examination of Anomalous Self-Experience, to detect self-disorder

Other uses
 Ease (sewing), the amount of room a garment allows the wearer beyond the measurements of their body
 Ease, a 1985 novel by Patrick Gale
 EASE/ACCESS, a pair of 1985 space shuttle flight experiments 
 European Association of Science Editors, a non-profit membership organisation

See also 

Easy (disambiguation)
 At Ease
 Usability
Ease-in and ease-out, methods of inbetweening in animation